Mitwa Phool Kamal Ke was a Hindi television series which aired on STAR Plus. It began on 27 May 2009 and ended on 22 January 2010. The story revolved around the orthodox practices that are prevalent even today in the Uttar Pradesh.

This show airs on an Afghan television channel called Ariana TV, where the drama is translated into Dari Persian since 17 April 2011 to 15 January 2012.

Synopsis 
Bela (Tanvi Bhatia), the protagonist, is the granddaughter of dictatorial Mamchand Chaudhry (Shahbaz Khan) : the ‘ruler’ of Ambakhedi in Uttar Pradesh. Mamchand rules with a rod of iron and forbids any lower caste person falling in love with an upper caste one. He is not fond of the daughters in the family, yet his youngest son has a daughter called Bela, whom he allows to live but treats her like an outsider. Bela falls in love with a lower caste man called Birju (Mohit Malhotra) whose parents were killed by Mamchand as his mother was upper caste and father lower caste.

Bela’s auntie, Rajbala (Nigaar Khan), is an antagonist. She concocts a plan to catch Bela and Birju together and is successful. After Mamchand’s men beat up Birju, he vows to marry Bela off to an equally orthodox man called Bhanu who is of the upper caste and son of Kemchand Chaudhry.

Bela and Birju escape from Mamchand with the help of Bela’s parents, Sargam and Raghav, who do not advocate Mamchand’s vile and evil doings. Mamchand manages to bring the pair back but is stopped from killing them by a revolution of the lower caste people. Birju fights with Bela’s oldest uncle, the main antagonist, and Nirbhay (Manish Wadhwa) and Nirbhay are shot dead. Nirbhay’s widow Rajbala vows to remove her marital garments when her husband’s killer’s corpse is in front of her. Birju is thrown in jail.

Mamchand is quick to capitalise on Birju’s imprisonment and marries Bela off to Adharv Chaudhry — a relative of Rajbala. At the same time, the police announce that they have shot Birju dead, yet his body is nowhere to be found. Bela soon finds out that Adharv was only interested in marrying her because he’s impotent and wants his servant Charan to rape her for them to have a child. Adharv’s first wife reveals this to Bela when Birju turns up at Adharv’s house under his new persona of Birjbushan Singh who befriends Adharv and stays at Bela’s marital home, whilst tormenting her to leave Adharv. Birjbushan manages to convince most of the Chaudhry household that he is not Birju except for Rajbala, who is adamant that Birjbushan is her husband’s murderer. He then scams Mamchand’s second son, Abhay, who loses all the family wealth. Mamchand is forced to sell his mansion to settle his debts, and his house ends up in the hands of Birjbushan.

Abhay finally reveals he had his older brother Nirbhay murdered so he could inherit all the fortune of the Chaudhry family. His parents, Mavhiri (Swati Chitnis) and Mamchand, are stunned to find that the lower caste Birju is not their enemy but is in fact their own son. Then, Abhay took the pistol to shoot his father (Mamchand), then Birju saved him. Abhay is sent to jail and Mamchand finally accepts Bela as his granddaughter. He vows to carry out her marriage ceremony with Birju in front of the whole village. Rajbala also mellows and removes her marital garments then she was apologising to Birju for accusing him as her husband's murderer.

Mamchand realizes that truly girls are the 'angels' of the house meaning they are very pious and obedient, although he didn't give his granddaughter the freedom she required. He believed that idea about his granddaughter out of being disappointed to love his sons because his second son, Abhay, betrayed him. Mamchand always gave his first and second sons the advantages, and his son Abhay betrayed his father and his older brother, Nirbhy.

Mamchand comprehends the humanity of not differentiating low-caste and high-caste people. As low caste Birju saved him from a high caste trying to kill him, which was actually his own son. The drama ends with a tearful and regretful Mamchand embracing his granddaughter and Birju in his arms. To pay for all his bad actions, Mamchand announced to abolish the old traditions of differentiating between low and high caste people. Thus, low and high caste people now could have same rights. Thus, Bela and Birju achieved success in love finally and their marriage was made after all the difficulties they faced.

Cast

Main characters
 Tanvi Bhatia ... Bela (main protagonist) 
 Mohit Malhotra ... Birju (low-caste guy who falls in love with rich Bela, main male protagonist) 
 Shahbaz Khan ... Maamchand Chaudhary 
 Swati Chitnis ... Mahaviri (Maamchand's wife) 
 Manish Wadhwa ... Nirbhay (eldest son of the Chaudhary family, main antagonist) 
 Nigaar Khan ... Rajbala (Nirbhay's wife) 
 Jeetu Vazirani ... Abhay (the second eldest son) 
 Vipra Rawal ... Devlata (Abhay's wife) 
 Manav Vij ... Raghav (youngest son who dislikes his father's evil doings, Bela's father) 
 Rudrakshi Gupta ... Sargam (Bela's mother) 
 ... Premo (Maamchand's aunt who supports Sargam) 
 Rocky Verma ... Bajrangi 
 Talluri Rameshwari … Kantha
 Pallavi Gupta ... Kajri
 Vishnu Bholwani ... Shanti

Other characters

 Vineet Raina ... Athaarv Chaudhary (Bela's second husband)
 Raunaq Ahuja ... Tejas (Nirhaby's son)
 Deepak Sandhu ... Soham (Abhay's son)

References

Indian drama television series
StarPlus original programming
Indian television series
2009 Indian television series debuts
2010 Indian television series endings
Television shows set in Uttar Pradesh